The Black Messiah is a live album by jazz saxophonist Cannonball Adderley recorded at The Troubadour in Los Angeles, California in 1971 featuring performances by Adderley's Quintet with Nat Adderley, George Duke, Walter Booker and Roy McCurdy with guest appearances by Airto Moreira, Mike Deasy, Ernie Watts, Alvin Batiste, and Buck Clarke. After many years of being out of print, The Black Messiah was reissued in 2014 by Real Gone Music; the new 2CD reissue included liner notes by music journalist/blogger Bill Kopp.

Reception 
The Allmusic review by Richard S. Ginell awarded the album 4 stars and states: "Still immersed in the burgeoning electronic jazz-rock explosion of the times, Cannonball Adderley goes further toward a rapprochement with the rock and soul audiences than ever before on this fascinating, overlooked double album."

Track listing 
All compositions by Julian "Cannonball" Adderley except as indicated
 Introduction - 0:50
 "Black Messiah" (George Duke) - 16:12
 Monologue - 2:20
 "Little Benny Hen" (Mike Deasy) - 4:15
 "Zanek" (Deasy) - 5:07
 "Dr. Honoris Causa" (Joe Zawinul) - 14:48
 "The Chocolate Nuisance" (Nat Adderley, Roy McCurdy) - 8:22
 "Untitled" (Airto Moreira) - 6:21
 "The Steam Drill" - 8:42
 "Eyes of the Cosmos" (Ernie Watts) - 4:51
 "Episode from the Music Came" (Alvin Batiste) - 2:39
 "Heritage" (Duke Ellington) - 4:43
 "Circumference" (Duke) - 3:18
 "Pretty Paul" - 2:48
 "The Scene" (Nat Adderley, Zawinul) - 2:16
 Recorded August 3-9, 1971 at The Troubadour in West Hollywood, CA.

Personnel 
 Cannonball Adderley - alto saxophone, soprano saxophone
 Nat Adderley - cornet, vocals
 George Duke - piano
 Walter Booker - bass
 Roy McCurdy - drums
 Airto Moreira - percussion
 Mike Deasy - guitar, vocals (tracks 4, 5, 7, 10, 11 & 13-15)
 Ernie Watts - tenor saxophone (tracks 4, 5, 8, 10, 11 & 13-15)
 Alvin Batiste - clarinet (tracks 11 & 13-15)
 Buck Clarke - African percussion (tracks 7 & 13-15)

References 

1971 live albums
Capitol Records live albums
Cannonball Adderley live albums
Nat Adderley live albums
albums produced by David Axelrod (musician)
Albums recorded at the Troubadour